Dhulipala Sitarama Sastry (24 September 1921 – 13 April 2007), known mononymously by the surname Dhulipala, was an Indian actor and thespian, known for his works predominantly in Telugu cinema.
He was noted for playing mythological roles, particularly the role of Shakuni. He began his acting career at the young age of 13 and went on to work in about 300 films. He shot to fame with Bhishma and Sri Krishna Pandaveeyam, acting alongside N. T. Rama Rao.

Life and career
Born on September 24, 1921, to Sankarayya and Ratnamma of Dachepalli village in Palnadu taluk of Guntur, Andhra Pradesh, he dropped out of school after Class. 8th and spent a year at Sankara Vidyalayam, Bapatla, studying Vedas. Subsequently, he worked as a clerk for an advocate. Simultaneously entering the stage, initially portraying female characters. He was introduced to film industry by his preceptor Mr. Gayudu (1927-2005), who was a famous actor, director, writer, singer and music director, make-up artist and also owned the costumes related to mythological dramas. Initially, Mr. Gayudu was selected for the role of Bhishma in the movie Bhishma and N. T. Rama Rao was offered the role of Duryodhana, but, due to a conspiracy to wedge Mr.Gayudu from entering the film industry, the Art Director of the movie, Mr. Vali, was arrested and made a deal out of it with Mr. Gayudu that if he drops out of the role of Bheeshma which he was offered and instead play the role of Duryodhana, he could get Vali released. Mr. Gayudu wasn't ready to accept the deal but for the sake of his friend Vali, he dropped out of the movie stating, his student Dhulipala, is capable enough to play Duryodhana. When NTR thanked him for dropping out of the movie, Mr.Gayudu replied showing him all the letters and telegrams that he received earlier, "I am backing off for the sake of my friend Vali. No matter how much you succeed in your career, don't forget that I was the first preference for the lead role of every movie and you had always been the second choice, as I couldn't make it on time and you grabbed the opportunities. I received Vendi Gada (Silver Gada) from Mysore Maharaja as a token of gratitude. That's my greatest achievement". Mr.Gayudu headed back home and never turned around. He realized that his brothers were right, as they said "Talent is injurious to career and life".

Hence, Dhulipala who was popular on the stage in the role of Duryodhana, made his debut with that film. Mr. Gayudu was the first choice for every lead role in mythological movies but his family members didn't want him to enter the film industry as they feared for his well-being after his uncle, the great actor Dommeti Surya Narayana was assassinated by his rivals, as he was the first generation superstar of Telugu film industry and was still thriving. so they concealed every letter and telegram that Mr.Gayudu received offering him the lead roles to work for their movies.
Dhulipala entered film industry in 1960, with the movie Bhishma, portraying the role of Duryodhana. He acted in around 300 movies and won several accolades and awards. He was a staunch devotee of Hanuman and was inspired by Swami Jayendra Saraswati of Kanchi Kamakoti Peetham to take sanyas in 2001 and establish Maruthi Ashram at Guntur City. He died on 13 April 2007. He was survived by his wife and two sons.

Selected filmography
 Murari (2001)
 Choodalani Vundi (1998)
 Sangeeta Samrat ( 1984)
Bobbili Puli (1982)
 Mahashakti (1980)
Punnami Naagu (1980)
Sri Tirupati Venkateswara Kalyanam (1979) as Bhrigu Maharshi
Sri Vinayaka Vijayamu (1979)
Sri Madvirata Parvam (1979)
Lawyer Viswanath (1978) as Judge
 Yuga Purushudu (1978)
 Jaganmohini  (1978)
 Daana Veera Soora Karna (1977) as Shakuni
 Kurukshetram (1977) as Indra
Bangaru Bommalu (1977) as Ranganna
Pichi Maraju (1976) as Dharma Rao
 Seeta Kalyanam (1976) as Vasishtha Mahamuni
 Mahakavi Kshetrayya (1976)
 Gunavantudu (1975)
Manushullo Devudu (1974) as Garudachalam
Manchi Manushulu (1974) as Dr. Anand
 Sri Ramanjaneya Yuddham (1974)
Ganga Manga (1973)
Kanna Koduku (1973) as Buchi Raju
Desoddharakulu (1973)
 Andala Ramudu (1973) as Secretary
 Bala Bharatam (1972) as Shakuni
Sri Krishna Satya (1972) as Karna
Collector Janaki (1972)
Pattukunte Laksha (1971)
 Mattilo Manikyam (1971)
Rajakota Rahasyam (1971)
Adrusta Jathakudu (1971) as Parandhamaiah
Pavitra Hrudayalu (1971) as Sivaiah
 Sampoorna Ramayanam (1971) as Vibhishana
Mayani Mamata (1970) as Janakiramaiah
 Balaraju Katha (1970)
 Bhale Rangadu (1969) 
 Ekaveera (1969) as Father of Veerabhupati
 Aatmiyulu (1969) as Veerayya
 Nene Monaganni (1968)
 Kalisochina Adrushtam (1968)
 Bandhavyalu (1968)
 Undamma Bottu Pedata (1968)
Nindu Manasulu (1967)
 Sri Krishnavataram (1967) as Satrajit
 Bhakta Prahlada (1967) as Indra
 Sri Krishna Pandaveeyam (1966) as Shakuni
Dorikithe Dongalu (1965)
 Pandava Vanavasam (1965) as Chitragupta
 Amara Silpi Jakkanna (1964) 
 Bobbili Yuddham (1964) as Narasarayalu
 Nartanasala (1963) as Duryodhana
 Sri Krishnarjuna Yuddham (1963) as Gayudu
Madana Kamaraju Katha (1962)
 Mahamantri Timmarusu (1962)
Kalimilemulu (1962) as Narasaiah
 Bhishma (1962) as Duryodhana

Awards
Nandi Award for Best Actor - 1968 - Bandhavyalu

References

Male actors in Telugu cinema
Indian male film actors
People from Guntur
1921 births
Nandi Award winners
2007 deaths
Telugu people
Male actors from Andhra Pradesh
20th-century Indian male actors